is a Japanese anime series by Ashi Productions. It ran in Japan from 1989 until 1990, spanning 51 episodes. The story has been adapted into a 3-volume manga series by Ayumi Kawahara. The title character Eriko is based on real-life Japanese idol Eriko Tamura, who performs the opening theme song and the last episode's ending theme.

Plot
Eriko Tamura is the only daughter of Yuusuke Tamura - chairman of renowned music company Tamura Productions - and former idol singer Minako Tamura. Having had a talent for singing since birth, she has always loved her parents’ media world. Then one day tragedy strikes when her parents get into a horrible car accident, which kills her father and leaves her mother in a coma. Now Eriko must take the path of singing, a path her parents did not want her to pursue. Things get worse when her uncle sets out to destroy her career. But in spite of all the hardship, she becomes an idol and wins hearts all over Japan.

Characters
 
Voiced by Akiko Yajima
Songs by Eriko Tamura
 
Voiced by Takaya Hashi
Eriko's father.
 
Voiced by Kumiko Takizawa
Eriko's mother.
 
Voiced by Naoko Matsui
Songs by Maiko Hashimoto
 
Voiced by Yasunori Matsumoto
Songs by Masahiko Arimachi

Songs
Eriko Tamura
Locomotion Dream - ED2
Namida No Hanbun - OP
Suki Yo
Honki
Watashi Wa Soyokaze
May Be Dream

Rei Asagiri
Ame No Highway
Gloria
My Song For You
Precious Days
Rolling Night - Duet Shogo & Rei
True Love
Unchained Heart ED1

Shogo Ohgi by Masahiko Arimachi
Rolling Night - Duet Shogo & Rei
Warrior
Midnight City
Sayonara No Natsu

External links

1989 anime television series debuts
1989 manga
Fictional singers
Japanese idols in anime and manga
Kadokawa Shoten manga
Music in anime and manga
Ashi Productions
Shōjo manga
TV Tokyo original programming